Dactylothele is a monospecific genus of velvet worm containing the single species Dactylothele habros. This species has 15 pairs of legs in both sexes. The type locality of this species is Nothofagus Mountain, New South Wales, Australia.

References

Further reading 
 

Onychophorans of Australasia
Onychophoran genera
Monotypic protostome genera
Fauna of Queensland
Endemic fauna of Australia
Animals described in 1996
Taxa named by Amanda Reid (malacologist)